Lorie Line (born 1958) is a classically trained pianist, composer, and performer from Reno, Nevada.

Life and career 
Line grew up in Reno, Nevada and has played the piano since she was five years old. As a young musician, she won several state piano competitions annually.  Line obtained a B.A. in Music, Piano Performance from the University of Nevada in Reno. She married Tim Line in 1986 before moving to Minnesota to accept a job as a pianist for Dayton's department stores. Line's musical career began to pick up speed as many Midwestern fans began to notice her talented piano skills while they shopped in these department stores.

Line has become one of the most published arrangers and composers in the last thirty years. Since 1989, she has written and arranged music, published over 50 books of sheet music, recorded 50 CDs, and released 44 albums on her own independent label. She has sold over 6 million albums and continues to tour and perform about 60 to 80 concerts per year. Thousands of people listen to her Pandora Lorie Line radio station and her music "spins" nearly 2 million times every week. In addition to her general concerts, Line has performed for congressmen, governors, and two presidents. She has produced three television specials for PBS and won the Ernst & Young Entrepreneur of the Year Award in 2002 in the entertainment category. Her story and home have been featured in hundreds of news articles and national magazines and her private costumes have been showcased in museums. In 2015, Line was inducted in the Minnesota Hall of Fame, joining ranks with artists such as Judy Garland, Bob Dylan, and Prince.

Line and her husband live on Lake Minnetonka in Minnesota where they have become active gardeners. Line herself is a member of the Wayzata Garden Club. They have two adult children and have raised hundreds of thousands of dollars for charities.

Partial Discography

A selection of Line's albums and music books, produced by her independent label Lorie Line Music, Inc. includes:

 Out of Line - 1989; retired
 Story Line - 1991; retired
 Sharing the Season, Volume I - 1991; retired
 Beyond a Dream - 1992; retired
 Sharing the Season, Volume II - 1993; retired
 Walking with You -1993; retired
 Heart and Soul - 1995; retired
 Sharing the Season, Volume III - 1995; retired
 Lorie Line Live! - 1996; retired
 Open House - 1997
 Music from the Heart - 1997
 Home for the Holidays - 1997; retired specialty project
 Holiday Collection - 1999
 Just Me - 2000; retired
 The Silver Album - 2000; retired
 The Show Stoppers - 2001
 Young at Heart - 2004
 The Most Wonderful Time of the Year - 2004
 My Favorite Things - 2005
 The Glory of Christmas - 2007
 Christmas Around The World - 2008
 The 20th Anniversary Edition - 2009
 Serendipity - 2010
 Vogue - 2011
 Practice, Practice, Practice! Book Three  September, 2011
 Christmas Bells Are Ringing! - November, 2011
 Practice, Practice, Practice! Book Four - April, 2012
 The Heritage Collection, Volume Six - March, 2012
 Practice, Practice, Practice! Book Four - April, 2012
 Practice, Practice, Practice! Book Five - September, 2012
 Immanuel - October, 2012
 Come Together - March, 2013
 Born in Bethlehem - October 2013
 The Early Years - March 2014
 The 25th Anniversary Christmas Special - October 2014
 The Heritage Collection, Volume Seven - May 2015
 Christmas in the City - October 2015
 Practice, Practice, Practice! Book Six - November 2015
 A Merry Little Christmas - November 2016
 Practice, Practice, Practice! Book Seven - August 2017
 The Heritage Collection, Volume Eight - September 2017
 King of Kings - October 2017

Public Television Specials 
 Lorie Line Live! - 1996; retired
 A White Christmas with Lorie Line - 2001; retired

References

1958 births
Living people
New-age musicians
Musicians from Reno, Nevada
University of Nevada, Reno alumni
Musicians from Minneapolis
New-age pianists
20th-century American pianists
20th-century American women pianists
21st-century American pianists
21st-century American women pianists